Stenoptilodes posticus is a moth of the family Pterophoridae that is known from Colombia and Peru.

Adults are on wing in September.

External links

posticus
Moths described in 1875
Moths of South America
Taxa named by Alois Friedrich Rogenhofer